A candi is a Hindu or Buddhist temple in Indonesia, mostly built during the Zaman Hindu-Buddha or "Hindu-Buddhist period" between circa the 4th and 15th centuries.

The Kamus Besar Bahasa Indonesia defines a candi as an ancient stone building used for worship, or for storing the ashes of cremated Hindu or Buddhist kings and priests. Indonesian archaeologists describe candis as sacred structures of Hindu and Buddhist heritage, used for religious rituals and ceremonies in Indonesia. However, ancient secular structures such as gates, urban ruins, pools and bathing places are often called candi too, while a shrine that specifically serves as a tomb is called a cungkup.

In Hindu Balinese architecture, the term candi refers to a stone or brick structure of single-celled shrine with portico, entrance and stairs, topped with pyramidal roof and located within a pura. It is often modeled after East Javanese temples, and functions as a shrine to a certain deity. To the Balinese, a candi is not necessarily ancient, since candis continue to be (re-)built within these puras, such as the reconstructed temple in Alas Purwo, Banyuwangi.

In contemporary Indonesian Buddhist perspective, candi also refers to a shrine, either ancient or new. Several contemporary viharas in Indonesia for example, contain the actual-size replica or reconstruction of famous Buddhist temples, such as the replica of Pawon and Plaosan's perwara (small) temples. In Buddhism, the role of a candi as a shrine is sometimes interchangeable with a stupa, a domed structure to store Buddhist relics or the ashes of cremated Buddhist priests, patrons or benefactors. Borobudur, Muara Takus and Batujaya for example are actually elaborate stupas.

In modern Indonesian language, the term candi can be translated as "temple" or similar structure, especially of Hindu and Buddhist faiths. Thus temples of Cambodia (such as the Angkor Wat), Champa (Central and Southern Vietnam), Thailand, Laos, Myanmar and India are also called candi in Indonesian.

Terminology 

Candi refers to a structure based on the Indian type of single-celled shrine, with a pyramidal tower above it, and a portico. The term Candi is given as a prefix to the many temple-mountains in Indonesia, built as a representation of the Cosmic Mount Meru, an epitome of the universe. However, the term also applied to many non-religious structures dated from the same period, such as gapura (gates), petirtaan (pools) and some of habitation complexes. Examples of non-temple candis are the Bajang Ratu and Wringin Lawang gates of Majapahit. The "Candi Tikus bathing pool" in Trowulan and Jalatunda in Mount Penanggungan slopes, as well as the remnants of non-religious habitation and urban structures such as Ratu Boko and some of Trowulan city ruins, are also considered candi.

In ancient Java, a temple was probably originally called , as evidence in the Manjusrigrha inscription (dated from 792 CE), that mentioned   "Prasada Vajrasana Manjusrigrha" to refer to the Sewu temple. This term is in par with Cambodian and Thai term prasat which refer to the towering structure of a temple.

Etymology

From Hindu perspective, the term candi itself is believed was derived from Candika, one of the manifestations of the goddess Durga as the goddess of death. This suggests that in ancient Indonesia the candi had mortuary functions as well as connections with the afterlife.

Another theory from Buddhist perspective, suggested that the term candi might be a localized form of the Pali word cedi (Sanskrit: caitya) — which related to Thai word chedi which refer to a stupa, or it might be related to the Bodhisattva Candī (also known as Cundī or Candā).

Historians suggest that the temples of ancient Java were also used to store the ashes of cremated deceased kings or royalty. This is in line with Buddhist concept of stupas as structures to store Buddhist relics, including the ashes and remains of holy Buddhist priests or the Buddhist king, patrons of Buddhism. The statue of god stored inside the garbhagriha (main chamber) of the temple is often modeled after the deceased king and considered to be the deified person of the king portrayed as Vishnu or Shiva according to the concept of devaraja. The example is the statue of king Airlangga from Belahan temple in Pasuruan portrayed as Vishnu riding Garuda.

Architecture 

The candi architecture follows the typical Hindu architecture traditions based on Vastu Shastra. The temple layout, especially in Central Java period, incorporated mandala temple plan arrangements and also the typical high towering spires of Hindu temples. The candi was designed to mimic Meru, the holy mountain the abode of gods. The whole temple is a model of Hindu universe according to Hindu cosmology and the layers of Loka.

Structure elements 

The candi structure and layout recognize the hierarchy of the zones, spanned from the less holy to the holiest realms. The Indic tradition of Hindu-Buddhist architecture recognize the concept of arranging elements in three parts or three elements. Subsequently, the design, plan and layout of the temple follows the rule of space allocation within three elements; commonly identified as foot (base), body (center), and head (roof). The three zones is arranged according to a sacred hierarchy. Each Hindu and Buddhist concepts has their own terms, but the concept's essentials is identical. Either the compound site plan (horizontally) or the temple structure (vertically) consists of three zones:
 Bhurloka (in Buddhism: Kāmadhātu), the lowest realm of common mortals; humans, animals also demons. Where humans still bound by their lust, desire and unholy way of life. The outer courtyard and the foot (base) part of each temples is symbolized the realm of bhurloka.
 Bhuvarloka (in Buddhism: Rupadhatu), the middle realm of holy people, rishis, ascetics, and lesser gods. People here began to see the light of truth. The middle courtyard and the body of each temples is symbolized the realm of bhuvarloka.
 Svarloka (in Buddhism: Arupadhatu), the highest and holiest realm of gods, also known as svargaloka. The inner courtyard and the roof of each temples is symbolized the realm of svarloka. The roof of Hindu structure usually crowned with ratna (sanskrit: jewel) or vajra, or in eastern Java period, crowned by cube structure. While stupa or dagoba cylindrical structure served as the pinnacle of Buddhist ones.

Style 
Soekmono, an Indonesian archaeologist, has classified the candi styles into two main groups: a central Java style, which predominantly date from before 1,000 CE, and an eastern Java style, which date from after 1,000 CE. He groups the temples of Sumatra and Bali into the eastern Java style.

There are material, form, and location exceptions to these general design traits. While the Penataran, Jawi, Jago, Kidal and Singhasari temples, for example, belong to the eastern Java group, they use andesite stone similar to the Central Java temple material. Temple ruins in Trowulan, such as Brahu, Jabung and Pari temples use red brick. Also the Prambanan temple is tall and slender similar to the east Java style, yet the roof design is Central Javan in style. The location also do not always correlate with the temple styles, for example Candi Badut is located in Malang, East Java, yet the period and style belongs to older 8th century central Javanese style.

The earlier northern central Java complexes, such as the Dieng temples, are smaller and contain only several temples which exhibit simpler carving, whereas the later southern complexes, such as Sewu temple, are grander, with a richer elaboration of carving, and concentric layout of the temple complex.

The Majapahit period saw the revival of Austronesian megalithic design elements, such stepped pyramids (punden berundak). These design cues are seen in the Sukuh and Cetho temples in Mount Lawu in eastern Central Java, and in stepped sanctuary structures on the Mount Penanggungan slopes that are similar to meso-American stepped pyramids.

Materials

Most of well-preserved candi in Indonesia are made from andesite stone. This is mainly owed to the stone's durability, compared to bricks, against tropical weathers and torrential rains. Nevertheless, certain periods, especially the Majapahit era, saw the extensive use of red brick as temple and building materials. The materials commonly used in temple construction in Indonesia are:

Andesite is an extrusive igneous volcanic rock, of intermediate composition, with aphanitic to porphyritic texture. Its colour ranges from light to dark grey. Andesite is especially abundant in the volcanic island of Java, mined from a certain cliffs or stone quarry with andesite deposit formed from compressed ancient magma chamber or cooled down lava spill. Each andesite stone is custom made into blocks with interlocking technique, to construct temple walls, floors and building. Andesite stones are easily formed and carved with iron chisel, making it a suitable material for temple walls and decorations carved as bas-reliefs. The walls of andesite was then carved with exquisite narrative bas-reliefs, which can be observed in many temples, especially in Borobudur and Prambanan. Andesite rocks are also used as the material for carved statues: the images of deities and Buddha.

Brick is also used to construct temples. The oldest brick temple structure is the Batujaya temple compound in Karawang, West Java, dated from 2nd to 12th century CE. Although brick had been used in the candi of Indonesia's classical age, it was Majapahit architects of the 14th and 15th centuries who mastered it. Making use of a vine sap and palm sugar mortar, their temples had a strong geometric quality. The example of Majapahit temples are Brahu temple in Trowulan, Pari in Sidoarjo, Jabung in Probolinggo. Temples of Sumatra, such as Bahal temple, Muaro Jambi, and Muara Takus are made from bricks. However, compared to lava andesite stone, clay red bricks are less durable, especially if exposed to hot and humid tropical elements and torrential monsoon rain. As a result, many red brick structures were crumbling down over centuries, and reconstruction efforts require recasting and replacing the damaged structure with new bricks.
Tuff is a volcanic rock that is quite abundant near Javanese volcanoes or limestone formations. In Indonesian and Javanese languages, tuff is called batu putih (white stone), which corresponds to its light color. The chalky characteristic of this stone, however, has made it unsuitable to be carved into bas-reliefs of building ornaments. Compared to andesite, tuff is considered as an inferior quality building material. In Javanese temples, tuff usually are used as stone fillings — forming the inner structure of the temple — while the outer layer employed andesite that is more suitable to be carved. The tuff quarries can be found in Sewu limestone ranges near Ratu Boko hill. The tuff fillings in the temple can be examined in Ratu Boko crematorium temple. Tuff was used as building material of outer walls of temple compound, such as te walls found buried around Sewu and Sambisari temple.
Stucco is materials similar to modern concrete, made from the mixture of sand, stone, water, and sometimes ground clamshell. The stucco as temple building material is observable in the Batujaya temple compound in West Java.

Plaster called vajralepa (Sanskrit: diamond plaster) is used to coat the temple walls. The white-yellowish plaster is made from the mixture of ground limestone, tuff or white earth (kaolin), with plant substances such as gums or resins as binder. The varjalepa white plaster was applied upon the andesite walls, and then painted with bright colors, serving perhaps as a beacon of Buddhist teaching. The traces of worn-off vajralepa plaster can be observed in Borobudur, Sari, Kalasan and Sewu temple walls.
Wood is believed to be used in some of candi construction or at least as parts of temple building material. Sari and Plaosan temples, for example, are known to have traces of stone indentions to support wooden beams and floors in its second floor, as well as traces of wooden stairs. Ratu Boko compound  has building bases and stone umpak column base, which suggests that the wooden capitals once stood there to support wooden roof structure made of organic materials. Traces of holes to install wooden window railings and wooden doors are observable in many of the perwara (complementary smaller) temples. Of course, wooden materials are easily decayed in a humid tropical climate, leaving no traces after centuries.

Motif and decoration

Kala-Makara 

The candis of ancient Java are notable with the application of kala-makara as both decorative and symbolic elements of the temple architecture. Kala is the giant symbolizing time, by making kala's head as temple portals element, it symbolizes that time consumes everything. Kala is also a protective figure, with fierce giant face it scares away malevolent spirits. Makara is a mythical sea monster, the vahana of sea-god Varuna. It has been depicted typically as half mammal and half fish. In many temples the depiction is in the form of half fish or seal with the head of an elephant. It is also shown with head and jaws of a crocodile, an elephant trunk, the tusks and ears of a wild boar, the darting eyes of a monkey, the scales and the flexible body of a fish, and the swirling tailing feathers of a peacock. Both kala and makara are applied as the protective figures of the temple's entrance.

Kala is the giant head, often takes place on top of the entrance with makaras projected on either sides of kala's head, flanking the portal or projecting on the top corner as antefixes. The kala-makara theme also can be found on stair railings on either sides. On the upper part of stairs, the mouth of kala's head projecting makara downward. The intricate stone carving of twin makaras flanking the lower level of stairs, with its curved bodies forming the stair's railings. Other than makaras, kala's head might also project its tongue as stair's railings. These types of stair-decorations can be observed in Borobudur and Prambanan. Makara's trunks are often describes as handling gold ornaments or spouting jewels, while in its mouth often projected Gana dwarf figures or animals such as lions or parrots.

Linga-Yoni 

In ancient Javanese candi, the linga-yoni symbolism was only found in Hindu temples, more precisely those of Shivaist faith. Therefore, they are absent in Buddhist temples. The linga is a phallic post or cylinder symbolic of the god Shiva and of creative power. Some lingas are segmented into three parts: a square base symbolic of Brahma, an octagonal middle section symbolic of Vishnu, and a round tip symbolic of Shiva. The lingas that survive from the Javanese classical period are generally made of polished stone of this shape.

Lingas are implanted in a flat square base with a hole in it, called a yoni, symbolic of the womb and also represents Parvati, Shiva's consort. A yoni usually has a kind of spout, usually decorated with nāga, to help channeled and collects the liquids poured upon linga-yoni during Hindu ritual. As a religious symbol, the function of the linga is primarily that of worship and ritual. Oldest remains of linga-yoni can be found in Dieng temples from earlier period circa 7th century. Originally each temples might have a complete pair of linga-yoni unity. However, most of the times, the linga is missing.

In the tradition of Javanese kingship, certain lingas were erected as symbols of the king himself or his dynasty, and were housed in royal temples in order to express the king's consubstantiality with Shiva. The example is the linga-yoni of Gunung Wukir temple, according to Canggal inscription is connected to King Sanjaya from the Mataram Kingdom, in 654 Saka (732 CE). Other temples that contains complete linga-yoni include Sambisari and Ijo temples. Eastern Javanese temples that contains linga-yoni are Panataran and Jawi temple, although the linga is missing.

Bas-reliefs 

The walls of candi often displayed bas-reliefs, either serves as decorative elements as well as to convey religious symbolic meanings; through describing narrative bas-reliefs. The most exquisite of the temple bas-reliefs can be found in Borobudur and Prambanan temples. The first four terrace of Borobudur walls are showcases for bas-relief sculptures. These are exquisite, considered to be the most elegant and graceful in the ancient Buddhist world. The Buddhist scriptures describes as bas-reliefs in Borobudur such as Karmavibhangga (the law of karma), Lalitavistara (the birth of Buddha), Jataka, Avadana and Gandavyuha. While in Prambanan the Hindu scriptures is describes in its bas-relief panels; the Ramayana and Bhagavata Purana (popularly known as Krishnayana).

The bas-reliefs in Borobudur depicted many scenes of daily life in 8th-century ancient Java, from the courtly palace life, hermit in the forest, to those of commoners in the village. It also depicted temple, marketplace, various flora and fauna, and also native vernacular architecture. People depicted here are the images of king, queen, princes, noblemen, courtier, soldier, servant, commoners, priest and hermit. The reliefs also depicted mythical spiritual beings in Buddhist beliefs such as asuras, gods, boddhisattvas, kinnaras, gandharvas and apsaras. The images depicted on bas-relief often served as reference for historians to research for certain subjects, such as the study of architecture, weaponry, economy, fashion, and also mode of transportation of 8th-century Maritime Southeast Asia. One of the famous renderings of an 8th-century Southeast Asian double outrigger ship is Borobudur Ship.

There are significant distinction of bas-reliefs' style and aesthetics between the Central Javanese period (prior of 1000 CE) and East Javanese period (after 1000 CE). The earlier Central Javanese style, as observable in Borobudur and Prambanan, are more exquisite and naturalistic in style. The reliefs is projected rather high from the background, the images was done in naturalistic style with proper ideal body proportion. On the other hand, the bas-reliefs of Eastern Javanese style is projected rather flat from the background, the images was done in stiffer pose and stylized style, similar to currently Balinese wayang images. The East Javanese style is currently preserved in Balinese art, style and aesthetics in temple bas-reliefs, also wayang shadow puppet imagery, as well as the Kamasan painting.

Deities

Kalpataru and Kinnaras 

The images of coupled Kinnara and Kinnari can be found in Borobudur, Mendut, Pawon, Sewu, Sari, and Prambanan temples. Usually, they are depicted as birds with human heads, or humans with lower limbs of birds. The pair of Kinnara and Kinnari usually is depicted guarding Kalpataru (Kalpavriksha), the tree of life, and sometimes guarding a jar of treasure. There are bas-relief in Borobudur depicting the story of the famous kinnari, Manohara.

The lower outer wall of Prambanan temples were adorned with row of small niche containing image of simha (lion) flanked by two panels depicting bountiful kalpataru (kalpavriksha) tree. These wish-fulfilling sacred trees according to Hindu-Buddhist beliefs, is flanked on either side by kinnaras or animals, such as pairs of birds, deer, sheep, monkeys, horses, elephants etc. The pattern of lion in niche flanked by kalpataru trees is typical in Prambanan temple compound, thus it is called as "Prambanan panel".

Boddhisattva and Tara 

In Buddhist temples, the panels of bas-reliefs usually adorned with exquisite images of male figure of Bodhisattvas and female figure of Taras, along with Gandarvas heavenly musicians, and sometimes the flock of Gana dwarfs. These are the deities and divinities in Buddhist beliefs, which resides in the Tushita heaven in Buddhism cosmology. 

Bodhisattvas are usually depicted as handsome man with peaceful and serene facial expression, adorned with luxurious jewelry akin to a king or a deity. While the Taras are his female counterparts, figures of beautiful celestial maidens. Both figures are depicted gracefully, usually holding various kinds of lotus (red padma, blue utpala, or white kumuda), monk staff (khakkhara) or fly whisk (chamara), and standing in tribhanga pose. The notable images of boddhisattvas could be found adorning the outer walls of Plaosan, Sari, Kalasan, Sewu, Pawon and of course Borobudur temple.

Devata and Apsara 

In Hindu temples, the celestial couple; male Devatas and female Apsaras are usually found adorns the panels of temple's walls. They are the Hindu counterpart of Buddhist Bodhisattva-Tara celestial beings. On the other side of narrative panels in Prambanan, the temple wall along the gallery were adorned with the statues and reliefs of devatas and brahmin sages. The figure of lokapalas, the celestial guardians of directions can be found in Shiva temple. The Brahmin sage editors of veda were carved on Brahma temple wall, while in Vishnu temple the figures of a male deities devatas flanked by two apsaras. The depiction of celestial beings of lesser gods and goddesses — devatas and apsaras, describes the Hindu concept of sacred realm of Svargaloka. This is corresponds to the concept of the towering Hindu temple as the epitome of Mount Meru in Hindu cosmology.

Guardians

Dvarapala 

Most of larger temple compound in ancient Java were guarded by a pair of dvarapala statues, as gate guardians. The twin giants usually placed flanked the entrance in front of the temple, or in four cardinal points. Dvarapala took form of two fierce giants or demons that ward off evil and malevolent spirits from entering the sacred temple compounds. In Central Javanese art, dvarapala is mostly portrayed as a stout and rather chubby giant, with fierce face of glaring round goggle eyes, protruding fangs, curly hairs and moustaches, with fat and round belly. The giant usually depicted as holding gada and sometimes knives as weapon.

In East Javanese art and Balinese version however, the dvarapala usually depicted rather well-built and muscular, with a fine example taken from Adan-adan site near Kediri. The exception is a gigantic dvarapala of Singhasari near Malang, East Java that measures 3.7 metres tall. The most notable dvarapala statues are those of candi Sewu, each pair guarding four cardinal points of the grand temple complex, making them a total eight large dvarapala statues in perfect condition. The dvarapalas of Sewu temple has become the prototype of Gupolo guardian in later Javanese art, copied as guardians in Javanese  of Yogyakarta and Surakarta. Another fine example is two pairs of dvarapala guarding the twin temples of Plaosan.

Lion 

The statues of a pair of lions (Sanskrit: Siṁha, Indonesian and Javanese: Singa) flanking the portal, are often placed as the guardians of candi entrance. Lions were never native to Southeast Asia in recorded history. As the result, the depiction of lions in ancient Southeast Asian art, especially in ancient Java and Cambodia, is far from the naturalistic style as depicted in Greek or Persian art counterparts, since the depictions were all based on perception and imagination. The cultural depictions and the reverence of lions as the noble and powerful beasts in Southeast Asia was influenced by Indian culture especially through Buddhist symbolism.

Statues of a pair of lions often founds in temples in Southeast Asia as the gate guardians. In Borobudur Buddhist monument Central Java, Indonesia, andesite stone statues of lions guard four main entrances of Borobudur. The thrones of Buddha and Boddhisattva found in Kalasan and Mendut Buddhist temples of ancient Java depicted elephants, lions, and makara. The statue of winged lion also found in Penataran temple East Java.

Stupa, Ratna and Vajra pinnacles 

The religions dedicated in the temples of ancient Java can be easily distinguished mainly from its pinnacles on top of the roof. Bell-shaped stupa can be found on the Buddhist temples' roof, while ratna, the pinnacle ornaments symbolize gem, mostly founds in Hindu temples.

The typical stupas in Javanese classical temple architecture is best described as those of Borobudur style; the bell-shaped stupa. The stupa in Borobudur upper round terrace of Arupadhatu consist of round lotus pedestal
(padmasana or "lotus pad"), gently sloped bell-shaped dome (anda), a rectangular or octagonal shape (harmika) sits on top of the dome serves as the base of hexagonal rod-like pinnacle (yasti).

Each stupa is  pierced by numerous decorative openings, either in the shape of rectangular or rhombus. Statues of the Buddha sit inside the pierced stupa enclosures. Borobudur was first thought more likely to have served as a stupa, instead of a temple. A stupa is intended as a shrine for the Buddha. Sometimes stupas were built only as devotional symbols of Buddhism. A temple, on the other hand, is used as a house of worship.

Ratna pinnacle took form of a curved obtuse pyramidal shape or sometimes cylindrical, completed with several base structure or pedestals took form as some ornamental seams (Javanese:pelipit). This form is known as keben pinnacle or the form of Barringtonia asiatica fruit. It can be found as the pinnacle of both Hindu and Buddhist temples. Nevertheless, it is most prevalent in Hindu temples. The example of temple with ratna pinnacle is Sambisari and Ijo temple. 

In Prambanan, the stylized vajra replaced ratna as the temple's pinnacles. In ancient Javanese temple architecture, the vajra pinnacle is probably served as the Hindu counterparts of Buddhist stupa pinnacle. This practice is preserved in Balinese Hindu temples of later period where the multi-tiered meru towers are crowned with vajra pinnacles. Nevertheless, vajra is actually a familiar symbols in both dharmic faiths. In later periods of Eastern Java temple architecture, the false lingga-yoni, or cube can be found in Hindu temple's roof, while cylindrical dagoba on top of Buddhist counterparts.

Location 

The high concentration of candi can be found especially dense in Sleman Regency in Yogyakarta, also Magelang and Klaten in Central Java; which corresponds to the historical region of Kedu Plain (Progo River valley, Temanggung-Magelang-Muntilan area) and Kewu Plain (Opak River valley, around Prambanan), the cradle of Javanese civilization. Other important sites with notable temple compounds includes Malang, Blitar and Trowulan areas in East Java. West Java also contains a small number of temples such as Batujaya and Cangkuang. Outside of Java, the candi type of temple can be found in Bali, Sumatra, and Southern Kalimantan, although they are quite scarce. In Sumatra, two exceptional sites are notable for its temple density; the Muaro Jambi Temple Compounds in Jambi and Padang Lawas or Bahal complex in North Sumatra.

The candis might be built on plain or uneven terrain. Prambanan and Sewu temples for example, are built on even flat low-lying terrain, while the temples of Gedong Songo and Ijo are built on hill terraces on higher grounds or mountain slopes. Borobudur on the other hand is built upon a bedrock hill. The position, orientation and spatial organization of the temples within the landscape, and also their architectural designs, were determined by socio-cultural, religious and economic factors of the people, polity or the civilization that built and support them.

Java

West Java 

 Batujaya, a compound of Buddhist Stupa made from red brick and mortar located at Batu Jaya, Karawang, West Java. Probably dated back to Tarumanagara kingdom in the 6th century AD.
 Cibuaya, a compound of Vishnuite Hindu temples made from red brick and mortar also located at Batu Jaya, Karawang, West Java. Probably linked to Tarumanagara kingdom in the 6th century AD.
 Bojongmenje, ruins of Hindu temple in Rancaekek, Bandung Regency.
 Candi Cangkuang, the only one of the few surviving West Java's Hindu temple estimated dated from the 8th century, located at Leles, Garut, West Java. Located on an island in the middle of a lake covered by water lilies. Unlike other Javanese temple characteristics by grand architecture, Cangkuang temple is more modest with only one structure still standing. Shiva statue faces east toward the sunrise. Date uncertain.

Central Java

Dieng Plateau 

The Hindu temple compound located in Dieng Plateau, near Wonosobo, Central Java. Eight small Hindu temples from the 7th and 8th centuries, the oldest in Central Java. Surrounded by craters of boiling mud, colored lakes, caves, sulphur outlets, hot water sources and underground channels. The temples are:
 Arjuna temple
 Semar temple
 Srikandi temple
 Puntadewa temple
 Sembadra temple
 Dwarawati temple
 Gatotkaca temple
 Bima temple

Gedong Songo 

South-west of Semarang, Central Java. Five temples constructed in 8th and 9th centuries. The site highlights how, in Hinduism, location of temples was as important as the structures themselves. The site has panoramas of three volcanoes and Dieng Plateau.

Borobudur and Kedu Plain 

The Kedu Plain lies to the north west of Yogyakarta and west of Gunung Merapi and south west of Magelang,  in Central Java.
 Borobudur. 9th-century Buddhist monument, reportedly the world's largest. Seven terraces to the top represent the steps from the earthly realm to Nirvana. Reliefs of the birth, enlightenment and death of the Buddha. A UNESCO World Heritage Site.
 Pawon. 8th-century Buddhist temple.
 Mendut. 8th-century Mahayana Buddhist temple.
 Ngawen. Five aligned sanctuaries, one decorated with finely sculpted lions. 8th-century Buddhist temple located east from Mendut temple. The name linked to Venuvana, "the temple of bamboo forest".
 Banon. 8th-century Hindu temple located north from Pawon temple. The few remains make it impossible to reconstruct the temple. The Hindu god statue from this temple is now located at the National Museum in Jakarta.
 Umbul, a 9th-century bathing complex in Grabag, Magelang
 Gunung Sari. Ruins of three secondary temples and the foot of the main temple remain.
 Gunung Wukir. One of the oldest inscriptions on Java, written in 732 CE, found here. Only the bases remain of the main sanctuary and three secondary temples.

Slopes of Merapi 
 Sengi complex. Three temples, Candi Asu, Candi Pendem and Candi Lumbung, Sengi, on the side of Mount Merapi. 8th and 9th century. The base of the temple has a climbing plant motif.
 Gebang
 Morangan
 Pustakasala
 Lawang

Near Yogyakarta 

 Candi Sambisari. 10th century underground Hindu temple buried by eruptions from Mount Merapi for a century. Discovered in 1966 by a farmer plowing his field.
 Candi Kadisoka, uncompleted 8th-century temple buried by eruptions from Merapi. Thought to have been Hindu temple, discovered in 2000.

Prambanan Plain 

 Roro Jonggrang, the main Prambanan complex. 9th century Hindu temple called the "Slender Maiden". Main temple dedicated to Shiva flanked by temples to Visnu and Brahma. Reliefs depict Ramayana stories.
 Sewu. Buddhist temple complex, older than Roro Jonggrang. A main sanctuary surrounded by many smaller temples. Well preserved guardian statues, replicas of which stand in the central courtyard at the Jogja Kraton.
 Candi Lumbung. Buddhist temple ruin located south from Sewu temple, consisting of one main temple surrounded by 16 smaller ones.
 Bubrah. Buddhist temple located between Candi Lumbung and Candi Sewu.
 Candi Gana. Buddhist temple ruin rich in statues, bas-reliefs and sculpted stones. Frequent representations of children or dwarfs with raised hands. Located east from Sewu complex in the middle of housing complex. Under restoration since 1997.
 Plaosan. Buddhist temple compound located few kilometers east from Sewu temple, probably 9th century. Thought to have been built by a Hindu king for his Buddhist queen. Two main temples with reliefs of a man and a woman. Slender stupa.
 Arca Bugisan. Seven Buddha and bodhisattva statues, some collapsed, representing different poses and expressions.
 Sajiwan. Buddhist temple decorated with reliefs concerning education. The base and staircase are decorated with animal fables.
 Candi Sari. Once a sanctuary for Buddhist priests. 8th century. Nine stupas at the top with two rooms beneath, each believed to be places for priests to meditate.
 Candi Kalasan. 8th-century Buddhist temple built in commemoration of the marriage of a king and his princess bride, ornamented with finely carved reliefs.
 Candi Kedulan. Discovered in 1994 by sand diggers, 4m deep. Square base of main temple visible. Secondary temples not yet fully excavated.

Ratu Boko and surrounds 

 Ratu Boko Built between 8th and 9th centuries. Mixed Buddhist and Hindu style. Partially restored palace auditorium. Ruins of the royal garden with a bathing pool inside.
 Arca Gopolo. A group of seven statues in a circle, as if in assembly. Flower decoration on the clothes of the largest are still visible.
 Banyunibo. A small 9th-century Buddhist complex. A main temple surrounded by six smaller ones forming a stupa. Restoration completed in 1978.
 Barong. Two almost identical temples on terraces. Believed to be 9th-century Hindu and part of a sacred complex, of which they were the crown.
 Dawangsari. Perhaps the site of a destroyed Buddhist stupa, now reduced to an array of andesite stones.
 Candi Ijo. A complex of three-tiered temples, but only one has been renovated. A main sanctuary and three secondary shrines with statues. Still under reconstruction.
 Watugudig. A group of pole sittings in the shape of a Javanese gong. About 40 have been discovered, but others may remain buried. Locals believe this to be the resting place of King Boko.
 Candi Abang. Actually a well that looks like a pyramid with very tall walls. In some aspects looks like Borobudur. Unique atmosphere.
 Candi Gampingan. Ruins 1.5m underground of a temple and stairs. Reliefs of animals at the foot of the temple are believed to be a fable.
 Sentono. At the base of Abang temple. Perhaps younger than other regional temples. Complex of caves with two mouths. Statue and bas-relief in left chamber.
 Situs Payak. The best preserved bathing place in Central Java. 5m below ground. Thought to be Hindu.

Klaten Regency 
East of Yogyakarta, Central Java.
 Candi Merak. Two 10th century Hindu temples, rich in reliefs and decorations, in the middle of a village.
 Candi Karangnongko. Difficult to date because remains are few.

Mount Lawu 
Near Surakarta, Central Java.
 Candi Cetho. On the slopes of Mount Lawu. A 15th-century Hindu temple 1470m above sea level.
 Candi Sukuh. On the slopes of Mount Lawu. 15th-century Hindu complex resembling a Mayan temple. Reliefs illustrate life before birth and sex education.

East Java

Malang area 

Malang, East Java.
 Candi Badut (also known as Liswa temple). Small Shivaite temple dating from the 8th century.
 Candi Songgoriti. Very similar to Candi Sembrada at Dieng, this Hindu temple is located in a valley between mount Arjuna and Mount Kawi, East Java
 Candi Jago. Late 13th century. Terraces decorated with reliefs in the distinctive (Javanese shadow puppet) style with scenes from the Mahabharata epic and underworld demons.
 Candi Singosari. Dedicated to the kings of the Singosari Dynasty (1222 to 1292 AD), the precursors of the Majapahit Kingdom, it was built in 1304.
 Arca Dwarapala. Dedicated to the kings of the Singosari Dynasty (1222 to 1292 AD).
 Candi Kidal.
 Candi Singosari.
 Sumberawan.
 Candi Rambut Monte.
 Candi Selakelir.

Blitar area 

 Candi Penataran. East Java's only sizable temple complex, with a series of shrines and pavilions. Constructed 12th through 15th centuries. Believed to be the state temple of the Majapahit Empire.
 Candi Bacem
 Candi Boro
 Candi Kalicilik
 Candi Kotes
 Candi Wringin Branjang
 Candi Sawentar
 Candi Sumbernanas
 Candi Sumberjati or Candi Simping
 Candi Gambar Wetan
 Candi Plumbangan
 Candi Tepas

Kediri area 

 Candi Adan-adan, a Buddhist temple located on the northeast slope of Kelud volcano near Kediri town, precisely in Adan-adan village, Gurah subdistrict, Kediri Regency, East Java. The temple is recently discovered in 2017. It is known with its exquisite fragment of Boddhisattva head and dvarapala guardian.
 Candi Surowono is a small temple, of the Majapahit Kingdom, located in the Canggu Village of the Kediri (near Pare) district in Java, Indonesia. It was believed to have been built in 1390 AD as a memorial to Wijayarajasa, the Prince of Wengker.
 Candi Tegowangi
 Arca Totok Kerot
 Arca Mbah Budho
 Candi Dorok
 Candi Tondowongso
 Gua Selomangleng
 Gua Selobale
 Calon Arang Site is a site who inspired Leak dance in Bali Indonesia
 Babadan or SumberCangkring Site
 Prasasti Pohsarang
 Candi Setono Gedong and today a mosque

Sidoarjo, Tretes, and Probolinggo areas 

 Pari, in Sidoarjo. Dated from 1293 Saka (1371 CE), this Majapahit red brick temple bear similarity with Champa architecture.
 Candi Sumur, in Sidoarjo. Located just a hundred meters from Candi Pari, probably built in the same era.
 Gunung Gangsir, in Gunung Gangsir hamlet, Beji village, Pasuruan Regency, located about 18 kilometres east from Pasuruan city. 
 Candi Jawi, Tretes. A 13th-century funerary temple. Slender Shiva-Buddhist shrine completed around 1300. 
 Penanggungan sites, Mount Penanggungan, which has terraced sanctuaries, meditation grottoes and sacred pools, about 80 sites in all including Candi Belahan believed to be the burial site of King Airlangga, who died in 1049. 
 Candi Jabung, east of Probolinggo, near Kraksaan. According to the inscription on the top of the temple portal, Jabung dates from 1276 saka (1354 CE).

Trowulan 

 Candi Tikus, Trowulan. Trowulan was once the capital of the Majapahit kingdom, the controller of most of the important ports of the day. Survived thanks to a sophisticated irrigation system. Tikus held run-off water from Mount Penanggungan for sanctification rites. Site also contains parts of the palace gate, entryway and water system.
 Candi Brahu, Trowulan. Location the temple front of Bubat Area in Majapahit Palace environment (7°32'33.85"S, 112°22'28.01"E). Brahu Temple is a budhis temple, built at 15 a.c and  restored during 1990 and was finished during 1995. There was no accurate note the function of the temple.
 Candi Gentong, Trowulan. Location the temple 350m east of Brahu temple(7°32'38.05"S, 112°22'40.65"E). Many Ceramic from Ming and Yuan Dynasty founded in this temple area. There was no accurate note the function of the temple.
 Candi Muteran, Trowulan. Location the temple north of Brahu temple (  7°32'27.72"S, 112°22'29.41"E). There was no accurate note the function of the temple.
 Kolam Segaran, Trowulan. Segaran pond is Majapahit Heritage (7°33'29.55"S,112°22'57.54"E) The Pond was found during 1926 by Ir.Maclain Pont. First restoration was 1966, finished at 1984. The function of this pond was as the place of recreation and to greet the foreign guest. This was the biggest ancient pond founded in Indonesia.
 Gapura Bajang Ratu, Trowulan.
 Gerbang Wringin Lawang, Trowulan.

Bali 

 Candi Gunung Kawi. Located in Sebatu village, Tampak Siring area, Gianyar regency. It is one of the oldest temple in Bali dated from 989 CE, the five temples is carved on the stone slopes forming grottoes.
 Candi Kalibukbuk. Located in Kalibukbuk village, Buleleng regency. It is one of the few Buddhist temple in Hindu dominated Bali. The temple is thought to be dated from the 8th century.
 Candi Mengening. Located in Banjar Sarasada, Tampaksiring village, Gianyar regency. Dated from the reign of king Marakata circa 1022 CE.

Sumatra 

 Candi Biaro Bahal, South Tapanuli, North Sumatra
 Candi Bumiayu, South Sumatra
 Candi Muara Takus, Riau
 Candi Muaro Jambi, Jambi

Kalimantan 
 Candi Agung, North Hulu Sungai, South Kalimantan, a Hindu Candi. South Kalimantan was a base of Hindu Kingdom of Negara Dipa, which then inherited by Negara Daha.
 Candi Laras, Tapin, South Kalimantan, a Buddhist Candi. Buddhist Kingdom in South Kalimantan was represented by the kingdom of Tanjung Puri.

Gallery 
Indonesian candi, Hindu-Buddhist temples, dated from the oldest circa 2nd century, to latest, circa 15th century.

See also 

 Architecture of Indonesia
 Ancient temples of Java
 Balinese temple 
 Buddhism in Indonesia
 Buddhist architecture
 Burmese pagoda
 Cetiya
 Chaitya
 Hinduism in Indonesia
 Hinduism in Java
 Hindu temple architecture
 History of Indian influence on Southeast Asia
 Indonesian Esoteric Buddhism
 Kyaung, temples in Myanmar 
 Pagodas
 Sand pagoda
 Stupa
 Vihāra
 Wat, temples in Cambodia, Thailand, and Laos

References

Bibliography

Further reading 
 Dumarcay, J. 1986 Temples of Java Kuala Lumpur: Oxford University Press
 Holt, C. 1967 Art in Indonesia Ithaca: Cornell University
 Patt, J.A. 1979 The Uses and Symbolism of Water in Ancient Indonesian Temple Architecture University of California, Berkeley (unublished PhD thesis)
 Prijotomo, J. 1984 Ideas and Forms of Javanese Architecture Yogyakarta: Gadjah Mada University Press
 Degroot, Véronique 2009 Candi, Space and Landscape: A Study on the Distribution, Orientation and Spatial Organization of Central Javanese Temple Remains Leiden: Sidestone Press, Issue 38 of Mededelingen van het Rijksmuseum voor Volkenkunde, Leiden,

External links 
 List of Candi, National Library of Indonesia
 General site about Borobudur and candi

Archaeological sites in Indonesia

Javanese culture
Cultural Properties of Indonesia